Project manufacturing is an operation designed to produce large, expensive, specialized products such as custom homes, defense weapons such as aircraft carriers and submarines, and aerospace products such as passenger planes, and the Space Shuttle. 

Project manufacturing is highly flexible, because each project is usually significantly different from the one before it, even if the project’s size and expense and high degree of customization, project manufacturing can take an extremely long time to complete.

Project Manufacturing is an operation designed to produce unique but similar products. It takes advantage of common manufacturing requirements (and therefore efficiencies), while allowing for customization into “unique” combinations. Unique orders may be managed like a project. The more components of that order that are common to other unique orders the more they may be manufactured – taking advantage of manufacturing methodology. Project Manufacturing then is the melding of Manufacturing and Project Management at a level where the most advantage may be gleaned from each to the financial advantage of the company.

Project management
Manufacturing